The Down County Board or Down GAA is one of the 32 county boards of the Gaelic Athletic Association (GAA) in Ireland, and is responsible for the administration of Gaelic games in County Down, Northern Ireland.

The County Board is responsible for preparing the Down county teams in the various Gaelic sporting codes; football, hurling, camogie and handball.

The county football team was the second from the province of Ulster to win an All-Ireland Senior Football Championship (SFC), following Cavan, and also the first team from Northern Ireland to win the Sam Maguire Cup since partition, doing so in 1960. The team won the cup again in 1961 and in 1968; this feat was not matched by another team until Down next won the All-Ireland SFC in its 1991 victory. Down and Cavan share the Ulster record for most All-Ireland SFC victories (five). As such, Down is regarded historically as a strong footballing county, and football is widely regarded as the dominant Gaelic sport within the county.

The Ards peninsula, however, is a hurling stronghold within the county, and while the county hurling team is not among the strongest on the island, it competes in the second-tier Joe McDonagh Cup, the 'Ardsmen' (as opposed to the nickname of the football team, the 'Mourne Men') have won a number of Ulster Senior and Minor Hurling Championships, despite the historical provincial dominance in that sport of Antrim. Down won the then second-tier Christy Ring Cup in 2013, its first. This entitled the team to enter the 2014 All-Ireland Senior Hurling Championship; however, Down opted to remain in what was then the second-tier. Down remained in the Christy Ring Cup as it became a third-tier competition, until they won promotion to the Joe McDonagh Cup, and eligibility for the All-Ireland Senior Hurling Championship, in 2021.

The minutes of the Central Council of the GAA record that on 30 April 1888 an application for affiliation was received from St Patrick's, Mayobridge, Co. Down. The acceptance of the application makes this the oldest registered GAA club in the county.

Governance

Maurice Hayes, the county hurler, became Secretary of the Down County Board in the mid-1950s and set a ten-year plan for the county football team to become the first team from north of the border to win an All-Ireland SFC.

Football

Clubs

The county's most successful football club is Kilcoo. Kilcoo has won the Down Senior Football Championship on eighteen occasions, and also won the Ulster Senior Club Football Championship in 2019 and 2021 and the 2021–22 All-Ireland Senior Club Football Championship.

County team

Down has won the All-Ireland Senior Football Championship (SFC) on five occasions, most recently in 1994. Down was not regarded as a football stronghold when Queen's University won the 1958 Sigerson Cup, and some of its leading players turned their thoughts to Down's county team dilemma. Down won the 1959 Ulster Senior Football Championship (SFC) title with six inter-changeable forwards who introduced off-the-ball running and oddities such as track-suits. In 1960, two goals in a three-minute period from James McCartan and Paddy Doherty helped Down to defeat Kerry, who were almost completely unbeaten at the time, and which brought to an end the Kerry football regime for a few years. In 1961, Down defeated Offaly by one point in a game that featured five first half goals. In that three-year period their supporters surpassed every attendance record in the book. When Down played Offaly in 1961 they set a record attendance of 90,556 for a GAA game. Against Dublin in the 1964 National League final a record crowd of 70,125 attended. The 71,573 who watched Down play Kerry in 1961 still stands as a record for an All-Ireland SFC semi-final. In 1968, Down defeated Kerry with Sean O'Neill and John Murphy goals, again in a two-minute spell. Despite a famous prediction that Down would go on to win three-in-a-row, the county took twenty years to regain its status.

In 1991, Down surprised favourites Meath, Barry Breen scoring the goal that sent his team into a lead of eleven points with twenty minutes to go, a lead that Meath could not match. In 1994, Mickey Linden sent James McCartan in for a goal directly under Hill 16, a goal which silenced Dublin and helped Down claim its fifth All-Ireland SFC title.

Hurling

Clubs

Five Down hurling clubs, Carryduff, Ballycran, Ballygalget, Portaferry and Bredagh play in the Antrim League. Ballycran and Portaferry used the experience to win Ulster Senior Club Hurling Championships. Ballygalget, Portaferry and Ballycran play in Antrim Div 1 while Carryduff and Bredagh play in Div 2.

Clubs also contest the Down Senior Hurling Championship.

County team

Down played in the Leinster Minor Hurling Championship for three years in the 1970s, even playing Antrim in an unusual Leinster semi-final at Croke Park in 1979. Although Down had not won the All-Ireland B championship in four final appearances, when the Ulster Senior Hurling Championship was revived, Down won titles in 1992, 1995 and 1997, losing the All-Ireland semi-finals by 14, 11 and 16 points. Down defeated Kilkenny in a Division 1 match in 1993 by a scoreline of 1–12 to 1–11. Down hurlers won the Christy Ring Cup for the first time in 2013, their greatest All-Ireland level success to date. This entitled them to enter the 2014 All-Ireland Senior Hurling Championship; however, Down opted to remain in the 2nd tier competition on this occasion.

Camogie

Down contested the final of the All-Ireland Senior Camogie Championship in 1948, having beaten Galway 1-5 to 1-1 in the All Ireland semi-final, with N Mallon the captain and C Mcgourty their best player, and 13-year-old Berna Kelly played in goal. They won the inaugural All Ireland junior championship in 1968 and inaugural minor (under-16) championship in 1974, further All Ireland junior championships in 1976 and 1991 and the intermediate championship of 1994 which resulted in a brief return to the senior championship. They won the All Ireland championship at Under-16 C level in 2011 and reached the 2011 Nancy Murray Cup final.

Leitrim Fontenoys won the 2004 and 2005 All Ireland junior club title.

Notable players include Marion McGarvey, Bonnie McGreevy, Máirín McAleenan, Catherine McGourty and Karen Tinelly. Síghle Nic an Ultaigh and Belle O'Loughlin served as presidents of the Camogie Association.

Under Camogie's National Development Plan 2010-2015, "Our Game, Our Passion", five new camogie clubs were to be established in the county by 2015.

Ladies' football
Down has a ladies' football team.

List of clubs
 Aghaderg-Ballyvarley - Website
 Annaclone 
 An Riocht - Website
 Aughlisnafin www.aughlisnafingac.com 
 Ardglass -
 Atticall - Website
 Ballela - Website
 Ballycran GAC
 Ballygalget GAC - Website
 Ballyholland Harps- Website
 Ballykinlar - ballykinlar.down.gaa.ie
 Ballymartin - Website
 Bredagh GAC
 Bright - Website
 Bryansford - Website
 Burren
 Carryduff - Website
 Castlewellan GAC
 Clann na Banna - Website
 Clonduff GAC - Website
 Darragh Cross - Website
 Russell Gaelic Union, Downpatrick
 Dromara - Website
 Drumaness - Website
 Drumgath - Website
 Dundrum - Website
 East Belfast GAA - Website
 Glasdrumman - Website
 Glenn - Website
 Kilclief Ben Dhreag- Website
 Kilcoo GAC
 Liatroim Fontenoys GAC - Website
 Longstone GAC - Website
 Loughinisland - Website
 Mayobridge - Website
 John Mitchel GFC - Website
 Cumann Pheadair Naofa (formerly known as Warrenpoint GAA)
 Newry Bosco GFC - Website 
 Newry Shamrocks - Website
 Portaferry -Website
 Rostrevor - Website
 Saul - Website
 Saval - Website
 St John's, Drumnaquoile
 St Michael's, Kilwarlin - Website
 St Paul's - Website
 Teconnaught
 Tullylish - Website

References

External links

 Official website
 Down at Hogan Stand
 National and provincial titles won by Down teams
 Club championship winners
 Senior and Minor Football Championship Finals

 
Gaelic games governing bodies in Northern Ireland
Gaelic games governing bodies in Ulster